Pipalyatjara (formerly Mount Davies) is an Aboriginal community in the  Anangu Pitjantjatjara Yankunytjatjara Lands in South Australia, comprising one of the six main communities on "The Lands" (the others being Amata, Pukatja, Kaltjiti, Indulkana and Mimili). At the 2016 census, Pipalyatjara had a population of 189. The residents are mainly Anangu who speak Pitjantjatjara as their first language.

Geography 

Both communities are located within the Tomkinson Ranges.

Kunytjanu is an outstation and waterhole to the south, serviced from Pipalyatjara. It is located on the road between Pipalyatjara and Watarru.

Climate
, based upon the climate records of the nearest weather station, the Giles Weather Station, just across the border and slightly to the northwest in Western Australia, Kalka experiences summer maximum temperatures of an average of 37.2 degrees Celsius in January and a winter maximum average temperature of 19.9 degrees Celsius in July.  Overnight lows range from a mean minimum temperature of 23.5 degrees in January to 6.8 degrees in June.

Annual rainfall averages .

History
Little is known about how the traditional owners and other peoples came to have a settlement at what is now known as Pipalyatjara.

Pipalyatjara was formerly known as Mount Davies, named after the tallest local peak.

The settlement was funded as an outstation during the 1980s.

Chrysoprase was mined at Pipalyatjara until recently.

Facilities
East Arnhem Regional Council provides local government in Yirrkala, which is in the council's Gumurr Miwatj Ward.

A general store provides for both the Pipalyatjara and Kalka communities.

As of 2007, South Australia Police were based at Murputja, South Australia and running patrols in the area. There was a rudimentary shed structure that serves as a police station when police are present.  a new, permanent policing complex is being built at Umawa. It will accommodate officers with specialist response capabilities, as well provide a base for a mobile unit which will be deployed in Fregon/Kaltjiti, Indulkana and Pipalyatjara. The service will work closely with child protection service agencies address child abuse and family violence issues.

Diesel power generation facilities supply power to both Pipalyatjara and Kalka. Water for the power station is supplied by SA Water.

The Pipalyatjara Anangu School serves both Pipalyatjara and Kalka Community.

The community-run Ninuku Arts project supports artists from Pipalyatjara and Kalka.

As with most APY settlements, Australian Broadcasting Corporation and Special Broadcasting Service television are available.

There is an unsealed airstrip.

A mobile polling booth visits Pipalyatjara every four years for elections of the Parliament of South Australia.

A permit is required for a member of the public to visit any community on the APY Lands, as they are freehold lands owned by the Aboriginal people.

Footnotes

Further reading

External links

Towns in South Australia
Aboriginal communities in South Australia
Australian Aboriginal missions
Anangu Pitjantjatjara Yankunytjatjara